Igreja de Santa Maria  is a 14th-century church in Serpa, Alentejo, Portugal. It is classified as a National Monument.

History
Igreja de Santa Maria is believed to be built over a former Arab mosque site. Indications for this remains. These include the bell tower built apart from church body and remains of a cylindrical base on the site. Santa Maria was also a name usually given to converted mosques.

References

Churches in Beja District
National monuments in Beja District
Buildings and structures in Serpa
Former mosques in Portugal